Dimitris Tziavras (born 16 February 1999) is a Greek volleyball player, who plays for the Greek Olympiacos Piraeus. In 2023, he was an integral part of the Olympiacos team that won the 2022–23 CEV Challenge Cup.

Honours

Club
 2022–23  CEV Challenge Cup, with Olympiacos Piraeus

References

External links
 Dimitris Tziavras at Volleybox
 Dimitris Tziavras at greekvolley.gr
 Dimitris Tziavras at Olympiacos SFP official website
 

1999 births
Living people
Greek men's volleyball players
Olympiacos S.C. players
Volleyball players from Thessaloniki